The 1938 TCU Horned Frogs football team was an American football team that represented Texas Christian University (TCU) in the Southwest Conference (SWC) during 1938 college football season. In their fifth year under head coach Dutch Meyer, the Horned Frogs compiled a perfect 11–0 record, won the SWC championship, finished the season ranked No. 1 in the AP Poll, defeated Carnegie Tech in the 1939 Sugar Bowl, and outscored opponents by a total of 269 to 60. TCU were the consensus national football champions of 1938.

At the end of the 1938 season, TCU quarterback Davey O'Brien won both the Heisman Trophy and the Maxwell Award as the outstanding football player in the United States. He was the fourth player to receive the Heisman Trophy and the first from outside the Midwest or East. During the 1938 season, O'Brien completed 93 passes for 1,509 yards and 19 touchdowns.

Two TCU players, O'Brien and center Ki Aldrich, were consensus first-team picks on the 1938 All-America college football team. TCU tackle I. B. Hale was also selected as a first-team All-American by Liberty magazine.

The Horned Frogs played their home games in T.C.U. Stadium (later renamed Amon G. Carter Stadium), which is located on campus in Fort Worth, Texas.

Schedule

1939 NFL Draft

Awards and honors
 Davey O'Brien, Heisman Trophy
 Davey O'Brien, Maxwell Award

References

TCU
TCU Horned Frogs football seasons
College football national champions
Southwest Conference football champion seasons
Sugar Bowl champion seasons
College football undefeated seasons
TCU Horned Frogs football